Liang Wannian is a Chinese epidemiologist, Executive Vice Dean at Tsinghua University's Vanke School of Public Health, and former lead of the Chinese National Health Commission's COVID-19 Response Expert Team.

Education and career 
Liang obtained a Bachelor of Public Health from Anhui Medical University in 1983, Master of Epidemiology from Anhui Medical University in 1986, and Ph.D of Epidemiology and Health Statistics from Peking Union Medical College in 2003.

COVID-19 
Liang is a key architect of China's zero COVID strategy and has been a regular face at Chinese Government press conferences on the progress of containing the virus since 2020.

Liang was team leader of the Chinese side of the joint expert team of WHO-convened Global Study of Origins of SARS-CoV-2, which was later mired in controversy for its inconclusive results, dissolved, and regrouped as the Scientific Advisory Group for Origins of Novel Pathogens.

In March 2022, Liang was dispatched to Hong Kong by the Central Government of China to help when a wave of Omicron infections surged out of control.

See also 

National Health Commission
Zero COVID

References 

Living people
Chinese epidemiologists
Academic staff of Tsinghua University
Year of birth missing (living people)